Xylopia brasiliensis, commonly known as pindaíba, is a species of plant in the family Annonaceae.

It is native to Atlantic Forest and Cerrado ecoregions in eastern and southern Brazil.

References

brasiliensis
Endemic flora of Brazil
Flora of the Atlantic Forest
Flora of the Cerrado